Dragan Savić is a Serbian former professional tennis player who competed for Yugoslavia.

Savić is a former coach of Serbian tennis players Slobodan Živojinović and Nenad Zimonjić.

Career
Savić played in two Davis Cup ties for Yugoslavia in 1978 and 1981 and won three of his four rubbers.

Personal
He is the father of banned Serbian tennis player David Savić.

References

External links

Living people
Serbian male tennis players
Serbian tennis coaches
Yugoslav male tennis players
Mediterranean Games silver medalists for Yugoslavia
Mediterranean Games bronze medalists for Yugoslavia
Competitors at the 1975 Mediterranean Games
Mediterranean Games medalists in tennis
Year of birth missing (living people)